European Socialists is a political party in Georgia. The party was founded on January 9, 2021, by four opposition MPs from the Alliance of Patriots party list. The party was registered in the National Agency of Public Registry on January 28.

History

After the 2020 parliamentary election, the opposition boycotted the Parliament, causing political crisis in Georgia. In December, 51 MPs from the opposition parties, including the Alliance of Patriots, which received four seats, asked the parliament to cancel their mandates. On December 23 Avtandil Enukidze (the fourth number on the Alliance of Patriots party list) announced his decision to keep the mandate despite of the Alliance of Patriots declaring a boycott. On January 4 the Parliament annulled the mandates of the top three on the Alliance of Patriots party list. On January 5 Fridon Injia, Gela Mikadze and Davit Zilfimiani (the fifth, seventh and eighth numbers on the Alliance of Patriots list) entered the Parliament, taking the seats of the members of Alliance of Patriots who resigned from their parliamentary mandates. Four opposition MPs proceeded to form the European Socialists party. The party ran in the 2021 Georgian local elections.

Political platform

Elected chairman Pridon Injia outlined the party's key objectives at the founding assembly: restoring territorial integrity of Georgia, reinforcing national independence, promoting the country's economic potential, being critical of the judicial authorities, and supporting further integration of Georgia into European Union and NATO. According to one of the leaders of the European Socialists, Davit Zilfimiani, the main goal of the party will be to develop "Western-style country based on social justice".

Electoral performance

Local election

References

2021 establishments in Georgia (country)
Political parties established in 2021
Political parties in Georgia (country)
Social democratic parties in Georgia (country)
Centre-left parties in Georgia (country)
Pro-European political parties in Georgia (country)